Ulrike Weyh (born 1 August 1957) is a German former gymnast. She competed at the 1972 Summer Olympics.

References

External links
 

1957 births
Living people
German female artistic gymnasts
Olympic gymnasts of West Germany
Gymnasts at the 1972 Summer Olympics
People from Itzehoe
Sportspeople from Schleswig-Holstein
20th-century German women
21st-century German women